The San Diego Velodrome is a 333m outdoor bicycle racing track located in the Morley Field Sports Complex in San Diego, California. Constructed in 1975 and resurfaced in 2010, it is owned by San Diego Parks and Recreation. Currently operated by the San Diego Velodrome Association, the track hosts regular races sanctioned by Cycling USA and training nights. In 2007, the track hosted the USA Cycling Collegiate Track National Championships.

References

Velodromes in California